Malachi Michael Fagan-Walcott (born 11 March 2002) is an English professional footballer who plays as a defender for Premier League club Tottenham Hotspur.

Club career
Born in Edmonton, London, Fagan-Walcott was brought up in Waltham Abbey, Essex and attended Debden Park High School. He is a youth product of Norsemen FC, and signed with Tottenham Hotspur in 2015. He signed his first professional contract with Tottenham on 17 July 2018. He debuted with Tottenham in a 3–0 UEFA Champions League round of 16 loss to RB Leipzig on 10 March 2020.

On 28 January 2021, Fagan-Walcott joined Scottish Championship side Dundee on loan until the end of the season. In March, after making two appearances, Dundee confirmed that Fagan-Walcott would return to his parent club due to injury.

International career
Born in England, Fagan-Walcott is of Jamaican descent. He was included in the England under-17 squad for the 2019 UEFA European Under-17 Championship.

Career statistics

References

External links
 Tottenham Hotspur Profile
 

2002 births
Living people
Footballers from Edmonton, London
English footballers
England youth international footballers
English sportspeople of Jamaican descent
Tottenham Hotspur F.C. players
Association football defenders
Black British sportspeople
Dundee F.C. players
Scottish Professional Football League players